Chrysochroa rajah  is a Jewel Beetle or Metallic Wood-boring Beetle of the Buprestidae family.

Description
These beetles have a glossy surface with beautiful iridescent colors varying from blue to green, sometimes with red longitudinal stripes or spots.

Distribution
These beetles can be found from India and China up to  Thailand and Laos.

Subspecies
 Chrysochroa rajah assamensis Guérin-Méneville, 1847 (China)
 Chrysochroa rajah nilgiriensis Kurosawa, 1978 (India)
 Chrysochroa rajah rajah Gory, 1840
 Chrysochroa rajah thailandica Kurosawa, 1978 (Thailand, Laos)
 Chrysochroa rajah unnoi Kurosawa, 1978

Gallery

References

Biolib
Zipcodezoo
 World Field Guide
Siam Insect Zoo and Museum

External links
 Insecta culture

Beetles of Asia
Buprestidae
Beetles described in 1840